Gina Marie Raimondo (born May 17, 1971) is an American politician, lawyer, and venture capitalist who has served as the 40th United States Secretary of Commerce since 2021. A member of the Democratic Party, she previously served as the 75th governor of Rhode Island from 2015 to 2021, and is the first woman to serve in the role.

Born and raised in Rhode Island, Raimondo began her career in venture capital following law school. In 2000, Raimondo co-founded Point Judith Capital, Rhode Island's first venture capital firm. She entered politics in 2010, when she successfully ran for the position of general treasurer of Rhode Island. During her first year in office, Raimondo prioritized reforming Rhode Island's public employee pension system.

In 2014, Raimondo was elected Governor in a three-way contest with 41% of the vote. While in office, Raimondo was elected to serve as vice chair of the Democratic Governors Association (DGA) for the 2018 election cycle. Reelected in 2018, Raimondo was tasked with overseeing the state's initial response to the COVID-19 pandemic. In the 2020 presidential election, Raimondo served as co-chair of Michael Bloomberg's 2020 presidential campaign.

Described as a "moderate technocrat" by The Washington Post, Raimondo is often characterized as a centrist within her party. Chosen to serve as Secretary of Commerce by President Joe Biden, Raimondo played a leading role in negotiations for the Infrastructure Investment and Jobs Act in 2021.

Early life and education
Gina Marie Raimondo was born in 1971 in Smithfield, Rhode Island, where she later grew up. Of Italian descent, she is the youngest of Josephine (Piro) and Joseph Raimondo's three children. Her father, Joseph (1926–2014), made his career at the Bulova watch factory in Providence, Rhode Island. He became unemployed at 56 when the Bulova company decamped operations to China, shuttering the factory in Providence. Raimondo was a childhood friend of U.S. Senator Jack Reed.

Raimondo graduated from LaSalle Academy in Providence. She was one of the first girls allowed to attend the Catholic school, where she graduated as valedictorian. She went on to Harvard College, graduating magna cum laude in 1993 with a Bachelor of Arts degree in economics. While at Harvard, Raimondo resided in Quincy House and served on the staff of The Harvard Crimson. Raimondo played rugby at the Radcliffe Rugby Club, and joked that this experience  "was good training for a career in politics".

Raimondo attended New College, Oxford as a Rhodes Scholar, where she received a Bachelor of Arts (later promoted to Master of Arts by seniority) and Doctor of Philosophy in 2002 in sociology. Her thesis was on single motherhood and supervised by Stephen Nickell and Anne H. Gauthier while she was a postgraduate student of New College, Oxford. Raimondo received her Juris Doctor degree from Yale Law School in 1998. Raimondo has stated that her experience working at housing and poverty clinics inspired her to attend law school.

Early career
Following her graduation from law school, Raimondo served as a law clerk to federal judge Kimba Wood of the United States District Court for the Southern District of New York. Later, Raimondo acted as senior vice president for fund development at the Manhattan offices of Village Ventures, a venture capital firm based in Williamstown, Massachusetts, and backed by Bain Capital and Highland Capital Groups.

Raimondo returned to Rhode Island in 2000 to co-found the state's first venture capital firm, Point Judith Capital. Point Judith subsequently relocated its offices to Boston, Massachusetts. At Point Judith, Raimondo served as a general partner covering health care investments; she retains some executive duties with the firm. Under Raimondo's leadership, Point Judith grew to over $100 million in assets and reportedly helped grow over twenty businesses.

General Treasurer of Rhode Island (2011–2015)

2010 election
In 2010, incumbent general treasurer Frank T. Caprio chose to run for governor rather than seek a second consecutive term in office. Describing the position of general treasurer as “a professional job, not a political job", Raimondo announced her candidacy for the position, her first campaign for elected office. In April 2010, former Democratic primary opponent Tom Sgouros dropped out of the race and endorsed Raimondo, leaving her as the only Democratic candidate.

Running a candidacy that emphasized her business credentials, Raimondo pledged to "use the power as the chief investment officer to lean on banks to invest again". Raimondo's platform called for financial empowerment programs at senior centers and schools, and for protecting consumers from predatory lending and mortgages. On November 2, 2010, Raimondo was elected general treasurer, defeating Republican nominee Kernan F. King by a margin of 62% to 38%.

Tenure
During her first year as general treasurer, she prioritized reforming Rhode Island's public employee pension system, which was 48% funded in 2010. In April 2011, Raimondo led the state retirement board to reduce the state's assumed rate of return on pension investments from 8.25 percent to 7.5 percent.

In May 2011, Raimondo released "Truth in Numbers", a report that advocated for benefit cuts as the solution to Rhode Island's pension problems, and she helped lead the effort to cut pensions, along with then-Speaker of the House Gordon Fox. The Rhode Island Retirement Security Act (RIRSA) was enacted by the General Assembly on November 17, 2012, with bipartisan support in both chambers. The next day, then-Governor Lincoln Chafee signed RIRSA into law. The legality of RIRSA was challenged in court by the public employee unions, but a settlement was reached in June 2015.

Under Raimondo's tenure, the pension fund was criticized for underperforming when compared with its peers. Raimondo's critics attributed the underperformance to a sharp increase in fees paid to hedge fund managers while her supporters argued investments in hedge funds stabilize investments during market downturns for more consistent returns over time.

OSIP program
Raimondo created the Ocean State Investment Pool (OSIP), designed as a low-cost investment vehicle intended to help the state and municipalities better manage and improve the investment performance of their liquid assets, which are used for day-to-day operations including payroll and operating expenses. $500 million in funds could be eligible for the program, which would enable Treasury "to extend its expertise to municipalities and improve investment returns by creating economies of scale". The program officially launched on April 23, 2012. As of November 2021, the OSIP program is currently managed by Fidelity Investments.

Payday lending
During the Rhode Island General Assembly's 2012 session, Raimondo advocated for a decrease in the maximum allowable interest rate on payday loans in Rhode Island. She hosted a roundtable discussion with then-Providence mayor Angel Taveras and members of the Rhode Island Payday Reform Coalition.

Raimondo submitted letters to the Senate and House Corporations Committees in support of payday reform legislation. She wrote "Far too many families are facing financial challenges that might be mitigated or avoided through a greater understanding of personal finance," and "payday loans exploit that lack of understanding... With numerous economic challenges, Rhode Island should not permit the sale of a financial product that traps so many customers in a cycle of debt." Raimondo wrote an op-ed in the edition of May 29, 2012 of The Providence Journal in support of payday lending reform.

Governor of Rhode Island (2015–2021)

Elections
In 2014, Raimondo ran for governor of Rhode Island, and won a contested Democratic primary against Providence mayor Angel Taveras and former Department of Education official Clay Pell. On November 4, 2014, Raimondo won the general election with 41% of the vote in a three-way race versus Republican Allan Fung and Moderate Party nominee Robert J. Healey.

Raimondo was elected to serve as the vice chair of the Democratic Governors Association (DGA) for the 2018 election cycle. She was subsequently elected as chair of the DGA in 2019. In 2018, Raimondo ran for reelection, defeating former secretary of state Matt Brown in the Democratic primary and Republican nominee Fung in the general election. Raimondo's reelection made her the first candidate to secure a majority of votes for that office since 2006.

Tenure
Raimondo was the first female governor of Rhode Island, and was one of nine incumbent female governors in the United States at time of her resignation. During her tenure, Raimondo was credited with cutting taxes every year and removed eight thousand pages of regulationsthirty percent of the state's regulations. She raised the state minimum wage to $11.50, created a sick-leave entitlement, financed the largest infrastructure program in the state's history, and made community colleges tuition-free. Raimondo appointed more judges of color than any of her predecessors, including Melissa A. Long, the first Black woman to serve on the Rhode Island Supreme Court.

As Governor, Raimondo presided over Rhode Island's initial response to the COVID-19 pandemic. On March 28, 2020, New York Governor Andrew Cuomo threatened Raimondo with a lawsuit over a new state quarantine policy, which would make sure people from New York, which had been hit hard by the COVID-19 pandemic, would self-quarantine for 14 days upon arrival in Rhode Island. On March 29, Raimondo repealed the order that specifically referred to New Yorkers, and broadened it to include any out-of-state traveler entering Rhode Island with intent to stay. Partnering with CVS, the nation's largest pharmacy chain, her state has achieved one of the nation's highest per capita levels of testing for COVID-19.

Approval ratings 
Between assuming office and the end of 2019, Raimondo consistently ranked towards the bottom of approval ratings for all governors in the United States. However, Raimondo's approvals saw a significant rise during the COVID-19 pandemic. State-by-state polling by Microsoft News in April 2020 found that 76% of Rhode Islanders said they approved of the work done by Raimondo and her administration "to keep people safe" during the ongoing crisis. This result meant that Raimondo was tied with the governors of North Dakota and Utah for the 12th-highest rating.

Statewide computer system rollout controversy
A widely criticized rollout of a new computer network system for the Rhode Island Executive Office of Health and Human Services dubbed the "Unified Health Infrastructure Project" (UHIP) in September 2016 saw scores of people without access to government programs such as food stamps and child care due to glitches in the software, designed by Deloitte. This computer crash created a backlog of more than 20,000 cases. The Raimondo Administration received several letters from the federal government in August and September 2016 warning that UHIP was not ready to be launched. On the orders of Raimondo, the UHIP launch occurred as planned despite these federal warnings. 

In response, U.S. Food and Nutrition Service's Northeast Regional Administrator, Kurt Messner, urged Raimondo to postpone the launch because it would interrupt or interfere with benefits the agency oversees. Messner said in the letter which local news outlets described as "strongly-worded" that "the transition plan remains inadequate and unacceptable." Messner also pointed out that the state had failed to gradually launch UHIP in phases or administer a live pilot test of UHIP. Messner opined that "Launching a system without having conducted a live pilot is against the intent of the regulations and against our best advice." The Raimondo Administration ultimately ignored the federal warnings resulting in benefit delays, system downtime, and benefit loss caused in error.

In December 2016, the federal government gave the state Department of Human Services less than a month to fix the UHIP computer system or risk losing $13million in federal funding. Federal officials judged that the state was not compliant in lowering a significant case backlog, starting a sufficient call-center, adequate staff training, and improving wait times at Health and Human Services field offices. In February 2017, Executive Secretary of Health and Human Services Elizabeth H. Roberts resigned from her cabinet post in the Raimondo Administration due to the failed roll-out of the UHIP.

In March 2017, Rhode Island Monthly reported that the U.S. Department of Justice opened an investigation into UHIP, specifically false claims and statements made about the Health and Human Services computer network rollout. The investigation was still underway as of summer 2017. In an interview, House Oversight Chair Patricia Serpa (D-West Warwick) said, "There's plenty of blame to go around. The auditor's report found that [the contract with Deloitte] was poorly written, poorly overseen and poorly executed. They were warned against the implementation because the system was not ready. Not only did they implement it, they displaced all of the most senior workers with the wealth of experience. We pulled all the plugs to make sure this was a failure."

According to documents submitted to the federal government, the cost estimate for UHIP through 2021 is $656million. State taxpayers will pay $154million of this amount while the federal government will pay the remainder. In January 2020, State Senator Sam Bell said a Rhode Island Senate Fiscal Report on Raimondo's budget proved that "a single UHIP update kicked 5,500 Rhode Islanders off their Medicaid" in November 2019 without due process and the decisions were based on a computer update. Bell went on: "Medicaid terminations need to be done with some due process. They should not come from a notoriously glitchy computer system. You should have a chance to fight the decision to rip away your health insurance. When you lose your Medicaid with no warning and no effort to transition you onto the exchange, the consequences can be deadly."

DCYF controversies
Under Raimondo, the Rhode Island Department of Children, Youth & Families (DCYF) had come under fire for the rate of deaths and near-deaths of children in its care. In a period between January 2016 and December 2017, there were 31 fatalities or near fatalities of children in its care, with eight being confirmed fatal. Raimondo appointed Trista Piccola as her new DCYF director in January 2017. Piccola's term was marked by the death and near-deaths of children, high staff turnover, votes of no confidence, and high budget deficits. Rep. Patricia Serpa and Rep. Charlene Lima called for Piccola's resignation, which finally occurred in July 2019.

In October 2018, the United States Department of Health and Human Services' Administration for Children and Families ordered the Raimondo Administration DCYF to improve in 33 of 36 areas assessed. The federal report noted that DCYF services were "inadequate, not developed when needed, or lacked consistent monitoring". Harvard Kennedy School professor and former Obama Administration official Jeffrey Liebman agreed with the recommendations and analysis of the report from the U.S. Department of Health and Human Services and claimed that the DCYF is "the most messed-up agency ever".

With Piccola's departure, the interim director is DCYF executive legal counsel Kevin Aucoin. Aucoin has served in an interim director capacity twice before when DCYF was without a permanent director. Secretary of the Rhode Island Executive Office of Health and Human Services and Raimondo cabinet member Womazetta Jones said in December 2019 that she was "very determined to stay the course of not hiring anybody unless it's the right person". As of December 2020 DCYF does not have a permanent director.

During Raimondo's tenure as governor, the DCYF) has focused on shifting children from congregate settings to licensed foster homes. DCYF has increased its capacity and utilization of licensed foster homes, including an increase in the number of licensed kinship families, from 280 in October 2019 to 576 in June 2020. As of December 2020, 83% of all children placed in out-of-home care are placed in a foster home. Since 2015, the department's intensive reforms have resulted in a 43% reduction in the number of youth placed in congregate care and a 39% reduction in the number of youth placed in out-of-state congregate care. At the same time, the department has increased the number of children placed in licensed foster family homes.

National politics
In early February 2020, Raimondo appeared alongside former Republican New York City Mayor and Democratic presidential hopeful Michael Bloomberg at the Wexford Innovation Center in Providence to endorse his candidacy, a move she described as "an easy call". Raimondo was named a national co-chair for the Bloomberg campaign.

Press secretary Jennifer Bogdan Jones of the Governor's Office told The Providence Journal "[Raimondo] is prepared to do whatever it takes to support Mike and defeat President Trump." As campaign co-chair, Raimondo would have "provided advice and attended events". Less than a month later, however, Bloomberg dropped out of the race and endorsed former Vice President Joe Biden. On the same day, Raimondo also endorsed Biden. She said Bloomberg "obviously" performed poorly on the debate stage but supporting his candidacy "was an easy decision for me at the beginning. But [supporting Biden] is an easy decision, too." Raimondo concluded that it was now time "to unify behind Joe Biden".

In May 2020, writer George Will wrote in favor of Raimondo being chosen as Biden's running mate in the 2020 election. However, Senator from California Kamala Harris was chosen as Biden's running mate instead.

Secretary of Commerce (2021–present)

Nomination

Following the 2020 United States presidential election, Raimondo was routinely mentioned as a possible cabinet secretary in the incoming Biden Administration. Though first seen as a likely Secretary of Health and Human Services, Raimondo announced on December 3, 2020, that she would not be taking that role. She was also considered for Secretary of the Treasury.

On January 7, 2021, Biden announced he would nominate Raimondo to serve as his Secretary of Commerce. She appeared before the Senate Committee on Commerce, Science and Transportation on January 26. On March 1, the Senate voted 84–15 in favor of cloture on the nomination, and confirmed Raimondo to the position the following day by a vote of 84–15.

Tenure

Raimondo was duly sworn in by Vice President Kamala Harris on March 3, 2021. In August 2021, Politico reported that Raimondo has become one of the "administration's secret weapons on the Hill" due to her role in negotiating the Infrastructure Investment and Jobs Act.

Raimondo was the only Cabinet member not to attend Joe Biden's first State of the Union address on March 1, 2022, since she was chosen as the designated survivor. In April 2022, Raimondo contracted COVID-19 during the Gridiron Club and Foundation Dinner.

Tech policy and cybersecurity
During Raimondo's tenure, the Department of Commerce sanctioned NSO Group for selling spyware technology. As Secretary of Commerce, Raimondo has worked with other administration officials, such as Secretary of Homeland Security Alejandro Mayorkas, on coordinating cybersecurity policy. In March 2021, Raimondo issued subpoenas for multiple China-based telecommunications firms owing to concerns, arguing that "unrestricted use of untrusted ICTS poses a national security risk".

As Secretary of Commerce, Raimondo has been a co-chair of the Trade and Technology Council since its creation in 2021.

According to Axios, "Raimondo has become the [tech] industry's key advocate within the Biden administration" during her tenure. Raimondo has faced criticism from some progressives for her opposition to the European Commission's Digital Markets Act (DMA) proposal. Raimondo voiced concern in December 2021 that the DMA would unfairly impact U.S.-based tech companies such as Google and Apple. Raimondo received criticism from Senator Elizabeth Warren, who argued that her comments contradicted the Biden Administration's efforts "to protect consumers and workers from Big Tech monopolies". In March 2022, Warren accused Raimondo "lobbying on behalf of Big Tech".

As Secretary of Commerce, Raimondo has helped lead the U.S. response to the global chip shortage, and has urged Congress to pass legislation that would boost domestic semiconductor manufacturing. Raimondo has argued that the chip shortage presents a national and economic security threat to U.S. interests.

Foreign relations

In September 2021, Raimondo accused China of violating the intellectual property (IP) rights of U.S. companies, and stated that the Chinese government has put in place "all kinds of different barriers for American companies to do business in China." In October 2021, Raimondo was criticized for stating "there's no point in talking about decoupling our economy from China's" by Republican Senator Tom Cotton.

Following the 2022 Russian invasion of Ukraine, the Department of Commerce under Raimondo implemented export controls in order to restrict Russia's access to military technology. In March 2022, Raimondo stated that Chinese companies attempting to sell semiconductor technology to Russia in violation of U.S. sanctions would face repercussions.

Electoral history

2010 General Treasurer election

2014 gubernatorial election

2018 gubernatorial election

Personal life and recognition
On December 1, 2001, Raimondo married Andrew Kind Moffit, in Providence. The couple have two children, Cecilia and Thompson Raimondo Moffit. The family resides on the east side of Providence. Raimondo is a practicing Roman Catholic and was one of the first girls to graduate from the La Salle Academy, a Catholic school in Providence.

Raimondo is a member of the Council on Foreign Relations and an Aspen Institute Rodel fellow. She was awarded an honorary degree from Bryant University, in 2012; and has received awards from the northern Rhode Island chamber of commerce and the YWCA of northern Rhode Island. Raimondo was elected alumni fellow at Yale, in 2014.

Community service
Raimondo serves as vice chair of the board of directors of Crossroads Rhode Island, the state's largest homeless services organization. Until 2011, she was an administrator of Women and Infants Hospital and chair of its Quality Committee. She has served on the boards of La Salle Academy and Family Service of Rhode Island.

See also
List of female governors in the United States
List of female United States Cabinet members
COVID-19 pandemic in Rhode Island

References

External links

Biography at the United States Department of Commerce
Campaign website

Inauguration Program from the Rhode Island State Archives

1971 births
21st-century American politicians
21st-century American women politicians
21st-century Roman Catholics
Alumni of New College, Oxford
American business executives
American people of Italian descent
American Rhodes Scholars
American venture capitalists
American women business executives
Biden administration cabinet members
Businesspeople from Rhode Island
Catholics from Rhode Island
Democratic Party governors of Rhode Island
La Salle Academy alumni
Living people
People from Smithfield, Rhode Island
State treasurers of Rhode Island
The Harvard Crimson people
United States Secretaries of Commerce
Women in Rhode Island politics
Women members of the Cabinet of the United States
Women state governors of the United States
Yale Law School alumni
Yale University alumni
Biden administration personnel